Shampoo Ni Lola is a 90s indie band from the Philippines.

History

Early years
Andy Intalan, Gilbert Robiso, Jeff Santos, Toz Cruz, and Wowie Mendoza met and became friends while studying at Pasig Catholic College. They started practicing at Jeff Santos' house in early 1992. The band's first public performances were at friends' parties and town concerts covering songs by artists like Nirvana, Black Sabbath and Juan dela Cruz .

Cruz, busy with other projects, was replaced as singer by Jhun Mora, with Liz Relleve as backing singer. Around this time the band started performing their own compositions, including "Nail", "The Day My Cat Died", the emotionally charged duet "Between Edges" and the angst-ridden "Tablado Ka" (You're Betrayed), which would become their first radio hit. These four songs would form their lo-fi EP, Shampoo Your Face!, which they distributed to radio networks and music companies as demos.

Success years
One of their demos was heard by Ed Formoso, who invited the band to be part of his project, "A Dozen Alternatives", as well as two more compilation albums, "Christmas on the Rocks" and "Mga Himig Natin - Pinoy Rock Revisited 2", for which the band recorded "Namamasko" (Caroling) and "Saranggola ni Pepe" (Pepe's Kite), respectively. After recording "Namamasko", Relleve quit the band to concentrate on her studies, and the band performed some high-profile gigs, including performances at two well-known clubs, Clubb Dredd and Mayric's. The band's profile was further raised with performances on shows like That's Entertainment, Sama-Sama Together and RJTV. They also made a second appearance at Chibugan Na.

They also guested and performed on radio (LA105 and NU107), including a live cover of the pop-jukebox classic, "Di Ako Iiyak" (I Will Not Cry) at LA105 played on an old un-tuned 6-string guitar with a missing string. This impressed one of the stations main disc jockeys, The Doctor, who would be key to the band's full-length collection. At the end of 1995, the band recorded for two more compilation records for different indie labels. The songs were "TV Miracle" (later re-recorded for their self-titled album) and "I Must Have A Girlfriend (On Christmas Eve)", but in the end the compilations were not released.

After not releasing any singles in the latter part of 1995, they were contacted by the Doctor, the DJ at LA105, who told them to meet with a new indie-company, JML Records, to discuss a possible full-length album, Shampoo ni Lola. This album was recorded within a month, and distributed by the following month.

When they had finished promoting the album throughout 1996 and 1997, the band prepared new compositions in the hope of recording a second album. Due to internal problems at the label this did not materialize, but the band remained active on the festival circuit until early 1999. Between 1999 and 2005, the band members concentrated on their careers outside the music industry and starting their own families, but continued to perform at music festivals occasionally.

Reformation
In late 2005, Shampoo ni Lola reactivated their weekend sessions and started working on new compositions, this time with Alex Ramirez as guitarist instead of Gilbert Robiso, who is now a businessman.

This new line-up performed at Purple Haze and Column Bar. In addition, they recorded six songs as part of sessions for a new album, to be released on their own label and scheduled for mid-2007.

Discography

Radio Singles
"Tablado Ka" - "A Dozen Alternatives" - Iba Music - 1994 (Iba Music is an affiliate of Viva Records.)
"Namamasko" - "Christmas on the Rocks - Iba Music - 1994
"Saranggola ni Pepe" - "Mga Himig Natin - Pinoy Rock Revisited 2" - Vicor Music - 1995 (An earlier hit for Celeste Legaspi)
"Praning na si Roger" - "Shampoo ni Lola" - JML Records - 1996
"Cute"  - "Shampoo ni Lola" - JML Records - 1996

Albums/EPs
Shampoo Your Face - Silong Music Group - 1993 (100 copies only)
 "Nail"
 "The Day My Cat Died"
 "Between Edges"
 "Tablado Ka"
"Shampoo ni Lola"  - JML Records, distributed nationwide by Star Records - 1996 
 "Praning na Si Roger"
 "Cute"
 "Asal Hudas"
 "Tuklaw"
 "TV Miracle"
 "Wala Kang Pakialam"
 "Anino sa Dilim"
 "Ganid"
 "Ten Seconds"
 "Wasted Mushroom"

Line-up

1992-1993
 Toz Cruz       - Vocals
 Wowie Mendoza  - Bass
 Jeff Santos    - Drums
 Gilbert Robiso - Lead Guitar
 Andy Intalan   - Rhythm Guitar

1993-1995
 Andy Intalan   - Leader/Rhythm Guitar
 Jhun Mora      - Lead Vocals
 Liz Relleve    - Co-Lead/Back-Up Vocals
 Wowie Mendoza  - Bass
 Jeff Santos    - Drums
 Gilbert Robiso - Lead Guitar

1995-2004
 Andy Intalan   - Leader/Rhythm Guitar
 Jhun Mora      - Lead Vocals
 Wowie Mendoza  - Bass
 Jeff Santos    - Drums
 Gilbert Robiso - Lead Guitar

2005-Present
 Andy Intalan   - Leader/Rhythm Guitar
 Jhun Mora      - Lead Vocals
 Alex Ramirez   - Lead Guitars
 Wowie Mendoza  - Bass
 Jeff Santos    - Drums

References

 

Filipino rock music groups
Musical groups established in 1992
Musical groups from Metro Manila